Arthur Frisbee Bouton (July 1, 1872 in Roxbury, Delaware County, New York – May 23, 1952 in Roxbury, Delaware Co., NY) was an American lawyer and politician from New York.

Life
He was the son of Burritt Beebe Bouton (1847–1891) and Elizabeth K. (Frisbee) Bouton (1849–1931). He married Lulu C. Craft (1870–1946).

Bouton was a member of the New York State Senate (29th D.) from 1923 to 1926, sitting in the 146th, 147th, 148th and 149th New York State Legislatures.

He was a delegate to the New York State Constitutional Convention of 1938.

He died on May 23, 1952, in Roxbury, New York; and was buried at the More Cemetery in Grand Gorge.

References

1872 births
1952 deaths
People from Roxbury, New York
Republican Party New York (state) state senators